Fort William Artist Management is an artist and talent management company with offices in Bloomington, Indiana and New York, New York.

Fort William Artist Management was forged by the partnership of Ami Spishock (formerly of Zeitgeist Artist Management) with Ben Swanson, Chris Swanson, and Darius Van Arman; co-founders of labels Dead Oceans, Jagjaguwar, and Secretly Canadian. Spishock manages Fort William in New York City as Head Manager, while the home base is located in Bloomington, Indiana.

Fort William was founded in 2011. Its music clients include Beirut, CANT Daniel Rossen, Department of Eagles, Fleet Foxes, Grizzly Bear, Grouplove, Holy Child JBM, Jens Lekman, Sondre Lerche,  Van Dyke Parks, and  The War On Drugs.

References

American companies established in 2011
Entertainment companies established in 2011
Talent and literary agencies
Companies based in Bloomington, Indiana